Ivan Lvovych Lypa (February 24, 1865, Kerch – November 13, 1923, Lviv (Vynnyky) was a Ukrainian physician and politician who served as Ukrainian minister of Religious Affairs. He is a father of another Ukrainian political leader and physician Yurii Lypa.

Ivan Lypa was born in Kerch, Taurida Governorate in a family of retired Imperial Russian army soldier, while his maternal line traces to Poltava region Cossacks who supported Ivan Mazepa. Ivan Lypa in a church-parochial school at the Greek John the Forerunner Church in Kerch. In 1878–1887 he studied at the Aleksandr Male Gymnasium in Kerch which he finished with excellence. During his gymnasium years Lypa became familiar with works of Russian thinkers Nikolay Chernyshevsky, Dmitry Pisarev, and Nikolay Dobrolyubov becoming a convinced follower of Narodniks ideas.

Despite receiving excellence in his Matura student degree, Lypa was marked as an unreliable and received a grade of 4 (out of 5) for behavior and therefore was barred from enrolling in big cities universities. Originally being offered to enroll in University of Dorpat Lypa declined and in 1888 enrolled into medical faculty of the Kharkiv University where he became acquainted with number of notable Kharkiv students like Borys Hrinchenko and Mykola Mikhnovskyi. Under influence from members of local Kharkiv hromada such as Dmytro Bahaliy, Oleksandr Katrenko, families of Rusov and Alchevsky, Lypa changed to purely Ukrainian national positions.

In the summer of 1891 invited by the Russian statistician Aleksandr Rusov to help with a real estate census of the Poltava Governorate, Lypa along with other Kharkiv University students Mykola Baizdrenko and Mykhailo Bazkevych as well as Kyiv student Vitaliy Borovyk visited the Taras Shevchenko Grave (Taras Hill) near Kaniv and created Ukrainian national underground political organization, the Taras Student Fraternity (Brotherhood of Taras).

References

External links
 Ivan Lypa. Encyclopedia of Ukraine

1865 births
1923 deaths
People from Kerch
National University of Kharkiv alumni
Kazan Federal University alumni
Ukrainian writers
Ukrainian politicians
19th-century Ukrainian physicians
Ukrainian military doctors
Healthcare ministers of Ukraine
Deaths from stomach cancer